Parawaldeckia is a genus of amphipod crustacean in the family, Lysianassidae. and was first described by Thomas Roscoe Rede Stebbing in 1910. The type species is Parawaldeckia thomsoni (first described in 1906 by Stebbing as Nannonyx thomsoni ).

In Australia species of the genus are found in waters off New South Wales, South Australia, Tasmania, Western Australia, and off Macquarie Island and the Australian Antarctic territory. They are also found off New Zealand, off southern South America, and in subantarctic waters. They are bottom dwelling at depths of 200 metres.

The body is segmented and flattened at the side, and there are seven pairs of walking legs at the front and three pairs of small limbs at the back.

Species
Species accepted by WoRMS (2022) are:
Parawaldeckia angusta 
Parawaldeckia dabita 
Parawaldeckia dilkera 
Parawaldeckia hirsuta 
Parawaldeckia karaka 
Parawaldeckia kidderi 
Parawaldeckia lowryi 
 Parawaldeckia parata 
 Parawaldeckia pulchra 
 Parawaldeckia stebbingi 
 Parawaldeckia stephenseni 
 Parawaldeckia suzae 
 Parawaldeckia thomsoni 
 Parawaldeckia vesca 
 Parawaldeckia yamba

References

Gammaridea
Fauna of Australia
Crustaceans of the Pacific Ocean
Crustaceans described in 1910
Taxa named by Thomas Roscoe Rede Stebbing